Zadadra fuscistriga is a moth of the subfamily Arctiinae. It is found in Myanmar and Assam, India.

References

Moths described in 1894
Lithosiina